"Queen of New Orleans" is a song by American rock singer Jon Bon Jovi, released as the second single from his second solo album, Destination Anywhere (1997) in August 1997.

Promotion
The single charted at number 10 on the UK Singles Chart and became a top-40 hit in Australia, Canada, Iceland, Ireland, and the Netherlands. The song features a music video which was released on the DVD Destination Anywhere: The Film.

Track listing
UK and European CD1 
 "Queen of New Orleans" (radio edit)  – 3:54
 "Queen of New Orleans" (album version)  – 4:32
 "Every Word Was a Piece of My Heart" (acoustic version)  – 4:56
 "Jailbreak" (live at the Forum, London June 12, 1997)  – 4:55

UK and European CD2 – limited edition digipack with poster 
 "Queen of New Orleans" (radio edit)  – 3:54
 "Queen of New Orleans" (album version)  – 4:32
 "Midnight in Chelsea" (live at the Forum, London June 12, 1997)  – 5:34
 "Destination Anywhere" (live at the Forum, London June 12, 1997)  – 5:24

Credits and personnel
Credits are lifted from the Destination Anywhere album booklet.

Recording
 Written in Los Angeles, November 1996
 Recorded and produced at Chapel Studios (Los Angeles), December 1996
 Mixed at Sarm West (London, England), February 1997
 Mastered at Sterling Sound (New York City)

Personnel

 Jon Bon Jovi – writing, vocals
 Dave Stewart – writing, guitar, production
 Maxayn Lewis – backing vocals
 Alexandra Brown – backing vocals
 Bridgette Bryant – backing vocals
 Hugh McDonald – bass
 Imogen Heap – keyboards

 Kenny Aronoff – drums
 Andy Wright – programming
 Obie O'Brien – mixing, engineering
 Marc Lane – mixing assistant
 Lee Manning – engineering assistant
 Mike Woglom – engineering assistant
 George Marino – mastering

Charts

References

1996 songs
1997 singles
Jon Bon Jovi songs
Mercury Records singles
Music videos directed by Mark Pellington
Songs about New Orleans
Songs written by David A. Stewart
Songs written by Jon Bon Jovi